Perebea glabrifolia is a species of plant in the family Moraceae. It is endemic to Brazil.

References

Endemic flora of Brazil
glabrifolia
Critically endangered plants
Taxonomy articles created by Polbot